Frederick Walter Smith (August 24, 1858 – July 31, 1917) was an American physician and surgeon in Syracuse, New York. By 1897, he was serving as Health Commissioner for the city of Syracuse and during June 1902, he was appointed as health officer of the city. He also served as coroner of Onondaga County, New York. Smith died on July 31, 1917, at the age of 58.

References

1858 births
1917 deaths
People from Syracuse, New York
Sons of the American Revolution
Syracuse University alumni